Anatoma shiraseae is a species of sea snail, a marine gastropod mollusk in the family Anatomidae.

Description
The length of the shell reaches 4.2 mm.

Distribution
This species occurs in Antarctic waters.

References

 Zelaya D.G. & Geiger D.L. (2007). Species of Scissurellidae and Anatomidae from Sub-Antarctic and Antarctic waters (Gastropopda: Vetigastropoda). Malacologia 49(2):393–443.
 Engl W. (2012) Shells of Antarctica. Hackenheim: Conchbooks. 402 pp.
 Geiger D.L. (2012) Monograph of the little slit shells. Volume 1. Introduction, Scissurellidae. pp. 1–728. Volume 2. Anatomidae, Larocheidae, Depressizonidae, Sutilizonidae, Temnocinclidae. pp. 729–1291. Santa Barbara Museum of Natural History Monographs Number 7

External links

Anatomidae
Gastropods described in 1990